Nina Novak (23 March 1923 – 15 March 2022) was a Venezuelan prima ballerina, choreographer, ballet director and dance teacher.

Biography
Novak was born in Warsaw, Poland on 23 March 1923, as Janina Nowak. She began her study of Ballet at the age of eight at the Warsaw Opera Ballet School.

From 1937 to 1939 she was a soloist of the Polish Representative Ballet, and after the war in the ballet groups of Feliks Parnell and Mikołaj Kopiński.

In the second half of the 1940s she left for the United States, where she became a prima ballerina, ballet master and teacher at Ballet Russe de Monte-Carlo. After finishing her career in 1960s, she left for Venezuela, where she opened her own ballet school, and since 1991 she has been the director of her own ballet school in Caracas, Ballet Clásico de Caracas.

In Poland, she made guest appearances in 1961 in Warsaw and Poznań in the ballets Giselle and Swan Lake, and in 1978 in the Coppélia ballet at the Grand Theater in Warsaw.

On 25 February 2020, the book Taniec na gruzach. Nina Novak w rozmowie z Wiktorem Krajewskim was published, consisting of an interview with Nina Novak by Wiktor Krajewski.

An honorary citizen of five cities in the United States, she died in East Norriton, eight days shy of her 99th birthday, on March 15, 2022.

Award
In 2017, she was awarded the Knight's Cross of the Order of Polonia Restituta.

References

External links
 

1927 births
2022 deaths
20th-century ballet dancers
Ballerinas
Polish ballerinas
Polish choreographers
Polish emigrants to Venezuela 
Venezuelan female dancers
Venezuelan people of Polish descent
Ballet teachers
Entertainers from Warsaw
Ballet Russe de Monte Carlo choreographers
Ballet Russe de Monte Carlo dancers